Dr. Franken is a platform game released in 1992 for the Game Boy and in 1993 for the Super Nintendo Entertainment System by Elite Systems. It was titled The Adventures of Dr. Franken for the SNES in the United States. The game features Franky, a Frankenstein's monster on a mission to collect the scattered body parts of his girlfriend, Bitsy.

A Mega Drive version was planned but never released. Versions for the Nintendo Entertainment System and Game Gear reached prototype stage, but were also not released. A Game Boy sequel, Dr. Franken II, was published in 1997.

Gameplay

The game consists of seven floors (20 stages in various places of the world in the SNES version) where various items and parts of Bitsy (Franky's girlfriend) are hidden.  Keys and special items are needed to access additional areas to find more body parts and equipment required to resurrect Bitsy. The Game Boy release of the game uses a password-based saving system to save the player's progress.

Music
The Game Boy and unreleased NES versions of the game use two classical music pieces throughout.  The title screen music is Bach's Fugue No. 2 In C Minor BWV 847 (The Well Tempered Clavier in C), and the gameplay music is Beethoven's Moonlight Sonata. The Game Boy and NES versions' music was arranged by Mark Cooksey. He composed the music in C-Lab Notator for the Atari ST.

Reception

Legacy
Franky also appeared in the 1993 Game Boy puzzle game Franky, Joe & Dirk: On the Tiles, along with Joe from Joe & Mac and Dirk the Daring from Dragon's Lair. Dr. Franken II is a sequel to the original and was released for the Game Boy in 1997. It was developed by MotiveTime and published by Jaleco. It is a platform game in which the lead character, Franky, must escape the castle in which he is trapped in order to search for pieces of a gold tablet which will help him to stave off debt.

References

External links

1992 video games
DTMC games
Game Boy games
Metroidvania games
Super Nintendo Entertainment System games
Cancelled Game Gear games
Cancelled Nintendo Entertainment System games
Cancelled Sega Genesis games
Platform games
Video games based on Frankenstein
Video games developed in the United Kingdom